Becca di Luseney (French: Pic de Luseney) (3,502m) is a mountain of the Pennine Alps in Aosta Valley, northwest Italy. It has a pyramidal look on all four sides, and its north face is covered with a glacier. A huge rockfall from its southwest face came down in 1952, completely destroying the village of Chamen and other settlements in the Valpelline valley. The mountain was first climbed in 1866.

References

Mountains of the Alps
Alpine three-thousanders
Mountains of Aosta Valley